Kibalchich is a crater on the Moon's far side. It lies to the northeast of the large walled plain Korolev, and is attached to the southeastern outer rim of the crater Tsander.

The rim of Kibalchich is slightly eroded, and the shared border with Tsander has produced a straightened rim along the northwest side. But the edge remains well-defined and the inner walls display some terrace-like shelves. The interior floor is relatively level, with the remains of a small crater rim in the southeast quadrant. There is a small ridge located near the midpoint.

Satellite craters
By convention these features are identified on lunar maps by placing the letter on the side of the crater midpoint that is closest to Kibalchich.

References

 
 
 
 
 
 
 
 
 
 
 
 

Impact craters on the Moon